The War Cross for Military Valor is an Italian order for military valor. Established in 1922, the cross may be awarded only in time of war.

Appearance 
The medal is a Greek cross made of copper. Inscribed on the horizontal arms is Al Valore Militare (For Military Valor). On the top arm of the cross is the monogram of the Italian Republic. The bottom arm depicts a Roman sword sheathed in bay leaves. The back of the cross depicts a five-pointed star, with rays radiating from behind that star out to the arms of the cross. The cross is suspended from a solid blue ribbon.

Notable recipients 
 Prince Aimone, Duke of Aosta
 Vernon Baker; Second Lieutenant, U.S. Army, MoH
 Heinrich Bleichrodt; German Kriegsmarine
 Gaetano Costa; Regia Aeronautica
 Douglas Fairbanks Jr, U.S. Navy
 Carlo Fecia di Cossato; Commander, Regia Marina
 Hamilton H. Howze; General, U.S. Army
 Edgar Erskine Hume; Major General, U.S. Army
 Clayton P. Kerr; Major General, U.S. Army
 Wolfgang Lüth; German Kriegsmarine
 Enrico Martini; Italian Lieutenant Colonel
 Billy Mitchell; Brigadier General, U.S. Army
 Kaoru Moto; Pfc, US Army, MoH
 Charles R. Train; WWI, U.S. Navy

References 

Military awards and decorations of Italy